Bromochlorobenzene is any of three different positional isomers consisting of a bromine atom and a chlorine atom as substituents on a benzene ring.

All three have been synthesized by various routes:
 1-Bromo-2-chlorobenzene: from 2-chloroaniline, via diazotization followed by a Sandmeyer reaction
 1-Bromo-3-chlorobenzene: by (3-chlorophenyl)trimethylgermanium by electrophilic substitution
 1-Bromo-4-chlorobenzene:
From a derivative of (4-bromophenyl)silane using N-bromosuccinimide
From 4-chlorophenol using triphenylphosphine dibromide or phenylphosphorus tetrachloride

References 

Chlorobenzenes
Bromoarenes
C